Michel Herr (born 16 February 1949 in Brussels) is a Belgian jazz pianist, composer and arranger. In addition to releasing jazz albums, composing for jazz ensembles and touring widely as a performing musician, he has also composed scores for films. As a bandleader he founded several bands: Solis Lacus, Michel Herr European Quintet, Michel Herr & Unexpected Encounters. He is also a music producer.

In 2020 he was awarded the Prix Sabam for Culture - Compositeur de Jazz 2019 for his album Positive / Music for sextet and string quartet (Igloo Records, 2019).

Selected works

Albums as a leader or co-leader 
 Positive / Music for sextet and string quartet (2019)
 Jazz Olympics (1 track in  tentet with Michel & Life Lines) (2008)
 The Music of Michel Herr (with the Brussels Jazz Orchestra) (2008)
 A tribute to Belgian Jazz (1998)
 Notes of life (1998) (Quintet)
 Just friends (Michel Herr & Archie Shepp)(1993) (movie soundtrack)
 Meet Curtis Lundy & Kenny Washington (Steve Houben & Michel Herr) (1983)
 Intuitions (1989) (trio)
 Short stories (1982) (with Wolfgang Engstfeld)
 Continuous flow (1980) (Engstfeld / Herr / Danielsson / Lowe)
 Good buddies (1979) (with Bill Frisell)
 Perspective (1978) (with Wolfgang Engstfeld)
 Ouverture éclair (1977) (Michel Herr Trio)
 Solis Lacus (1975)

Albums as a piano player, composer, arranger, etc... (a selection) 
 O Celli in America (8 cellists. Arranger of an Ellington medley) (2022)
 The black days sessions (Daniel Romeo/Arranger) (2020)
 We have a dream (Tutu Puoane & Brussels Jazz Orchestra/ Arranger) (2018)
 Udiverse (Fabrice Alleman & Chamber orchestra/Arranger & composer) (2017)
 The string project (Philip Catherine/ Arranger) (2016) Echo Jazz Award 2016 (D)
 Colors of Time (Thierry Lang & David Linx/ Arranger) (2013)
 Crush (Ivan Paduart & the Metropole Orchestra/ Arranger) (2010)
 Let me hear a simple song (Radoni's Tribe / Arranger) (2009)
 Jazz Olympics (1 track feat. David Linx / Brussels Jazz Orchestra) (2008)
 Changing Faces (1 track feat. David Linx / Brussels Jazz Orchestra) (2007)
 Sides of Life (Fabrice Alleman) (2004)
 Restless (Jean-Pierre Catoul / Peter Hertmans) (1999)
 The live takes (Toots Thielemans) (1999)
 En public (Phil Abraham Quartet) (1997)
 O brilho do Sol (Marito Correa) (1996)
 Intensive Act" (Félix Simtaine) (1996)
 L'affaire (Vladimir Cosma/Toots Thielemans, movie soundtrack) (1994)
 Loop the loop (Fabrice Alleman Quartet) (1993)
 Take it from the top (Denise Jannah) (1991)
 Bim bim (Bruno Castellucci) (1987)
 Extremes (Act Big Band and guests) (1987)
 Solid Steps (Joe Lovano) (1986)
 Transparence (Philip Catherine) (1986)
 Sweet seventina (Bert Joris) (1985)
 Your precious love (Toots Thielemans) (1984)
 Soon spring (John Ruocco) (1983)
 Steve Houben + strings (1982)
 Act Big Band (1981)
 Remembering Bobby Jaspar and Rene Thomas (Saxo 1000) (1980)
 Dom Rocket (Gijs Hendriks  Quartet) (1979)
 Live in Solothurn (Zbigniew Seifert Variospheres) (rec. 1976, released on cd in 2017)

 As a composer, arranger for movies 
 Le Scoop (Jean-Louis Colmant) (1977) (TV)
 La Mésaventure (Freddy Charles) (1980) (TV)
 Les Fugitifs (Freddy Charles)  (1981) (TV)
 San Francisco (Freddy Charles)  (1982) (TV)
 Les Magiciens du mercredi (Freddy Charles)  (1984) (TV)
 Just Friends (Marc-Henri Wajnberg) (1993)
 Éclats de famille (Didier Grousset) (1994) (TV)
 Les Monos / Le responsable (Didier Grousset)  (1999) (TV)
 Le Coup du lapin (Didier Grousset) (2000) (TV)
 Odette Toulemonde (Eric-Emmanuel Schmitt) (Nicola Piovani) (arranger/orchestrator of Joséphine Baker songs) (2007)
 Un crime très populaire'' (Didier Grousset)  (2007) (TV)

References

External links 
 Official site
 

1949 births
Living people
Musicians from Brussels
Belgian musicians
Belgian film score composers
Male film score composers
Belgian jazz composers
Belgian jazz pianists
Belgian jazz musicians
21st-century Belgian musicians
21st-century jazz composers
20th-century Belgian musicians
20th-century jazz composers
Male pianists
21st-century pianists
Male jazz composers
20th-century Belgian male musicians
21st-century male musicians
Igloo Records artists